(born February 18, 1982) assumed the duties of Miss Universe Japan 2007, after originally being the second runner-up. She became Miss Universe Japan after the winner, Riyo Mori, claimed the Miss Universe crown and first runner-up, Rei Hamada, turned the title down. Akiko is a graduate of Tamagawa University and has an elementary school teacher's certificate. She has travelled to 30 countries on her own doing volunteer work. She is a model and stands 5'8" (173 cm).

References

External links 
Official page by Horipro 
Official blog 

1982 births
Living people
People from Yokohama
Japanese beauty pageant winners